Parrott is a town in Terrell County, Georgia, United States. The population was 158 as of the 2010 census. It is part of the Albany, Georgia Metropolitan Statistical Area.

History
Parrott was founded in the 1860s by James and John L. Parrott, pioneer citizens. The Georgia General Assembly incorporated Parrott as a town in 1889.

Geography
The town is located in southwest Georgia along Georgia State Route 520 (South Georgia Parkway), which leads southeast 9 mi (14 km) to Dawson, the Terrell County seat, and northwest 18 mi (29 km) to Richland. Columbus is 53 mi (85 km) northwest and Albany is 34 mi (55 km) southeast.

Demographics

As of the census of 2000, there were 156 people, 68 households, and 41 families residing in the town. The racial makeup of the town was 71.79% White, 27.56% African American, and 0.64% from two or more races. Hispanic or Latino people of any race were 5.13% of the population.

There were 68 households, out of which 23.5% had children under the age of 18 living with them, 47.1% were married couples living together, 13.2% had a female householder with no husband present, and 39.7% were non-families. 32.4% of all households were made up of individuals, and 20.6% had someone living alone who was 65 years of age or older. The average household size was 2.29 and the average family size was 2.95.

In the town, the population was spread out, with 17.9% under the age of 18, 5.8% from 18 to 24, 19.9% from 25 to 44, 32.7% from 45 to 64, and 23.7% who were 65 years of age or older. The median age was 52 years. For every 100 females, there were 92.6 males. For every 100 females age 18 and over, there were 82.9 males.

The median income for a household in the town was $24,167, and the median income for a family was $28,750. Males had a median income of $18,750 versus $16,250 for females. The per capita income for the town was $16,170. About 19.0% of families and 13.9% of the population were below the poverty line, including 41.7% of those under the age of eighteen and 6.0% of those 65 or over.

Arts and culture

Parts of the 1980 western film The Long Riders were filmed in Parrot, notably the "Northfield" scene.

Artrain USA visited Parrott in 1976, one of the few non-metropolitan stops on its journey. The event was accompanied by a large arts and crafts show, along with craft demonstrations. Jimmy Carter attended the event to cut the ribbon and open the show, and gave a speech to commemorate the occasion.

Notable people
 Bob Hanner, Georgia state legislator and businessman
 Joanna Moore, actress and mother of Tatum O'Neal

References

Towns in Terrell County, Georgia
Towns in Georgia (U.S. state)
Albany metropolitan area, Georgia